Fabras is a commune in the Ardèche department in southern France.

Geography
The river Lignon forms all of the commune's western border; the river Ardèche forms small part of its northeastern border.

Population

Personalities
Colette Bonzo (1917–1967): expressionist painter who exhibited in Paris, in the provinces and abroad. She worked mainly in Paris and bought the Château du Pin in 1957. She is buried in the cemetery of Fabras. Some of his works are presented to the public at the Chateau du Pin.

See also
Communes of the Ardèche department

References

Communes of Ardèche
Ardèche communes articles needing translation from French Wikipedia